Ivan Senay is a Ukrainian amateur boxer who won the gold medal at the 2008 European Amateur Boxing Championships in the middleweight division.

European Amateur Championships
Senay represented the Ukraine at the 2008 European Amateur Boxing Championships in Liverpool, England. He won a gold medal after beating Russia's Maxim Koptyakov 9:4 in the final.

European Championships results
2008 (as a Middleweight)
Preliminary round - BYE
Second round Defeated Mladen Manev (Bulgaria) 9:3
Quarter Finals Defeated Istvan Szili (Hungary) 11:4
Semi Finals Defeated Victor Cotiujanshiu (Moldova) 8:4
Finals Defeated Maxim Koptyakov (Russia) 9:4

References

1983 births
Living people
Middleweight boxers
Ukrainian male boxers
21st-century Ukrainian people